The 2009–10 Liechtenstein Cup was the sixty-fifth season of Liechtenstein's annual football cup competition. Seven clubs competed with a total of eighteen teams for one spot in the second qualifying round of the UEFA Europa League. Defending champions were FC Vaduz, who won the cup continuously since 1998 and defended their title.

First round
The First Round featured twelve teams. The only first teams of a club that had to compete in this round were FC Triesen and FC Triesenberg, while the other two teams eligible for the first round, FC Ruggell and FC Balzers II, received a bye. The games were played on 18 – 19 August 2009.

|colspan="3" style="background-color:#99CCCC"|

|-
|colspan="3" style="background-color:#99CCCC"|

|}

Second round
The six winners of the First Round, along with the two teams who had received a bye, competed in the Second Round. The first teams of FC Balzers, USV Eschen/Mauren, FC Schaan and FC Vaduz were all given a bye in this round. The games were played on 15, 16, and 23 September 2009.

|colspan="3" style="background-color:#99CCCC"|

|-
|colspan="3" style="background-color:#99CCCC"|

|-
|colspan="3" style="background-color:#99CCCC"|

|}

Quarterfinals
The four winners of the Second Round, along with the four teams who had received a bye, competed in the Quarterfinals. The games were played on 20, 21, 27, and 28 October 2009.

|colspan="3" style="background-color:#99CCCC"|

|-
|colspan="3" style="background-color:#99CCCC"|

|-
|colspan="3" style="background-color:#99CCCC"|

|-
|colspan="3" style="background-color:#99CCCC"|

|}

Semifinals
The four winners of the Quarterfinals competed in the Semifinals. The games were played on 6 April 2010.

|colspan="3" style="background-color:#99CCCC"|

|}

Final
The final, played between FC Vaduz and USV Eschen/Mauren was played in the national stadium, Rheinpark Stadion, which is also FC Vaduz' home-ground. At full-time the score was 1-1, but after penalties FC Vaduz had a winning scoreline of 4–2. The game was played on 13 May 2010.

References

External links
 Official site 
 Liechtenstein Cup on soccerway
 RSSSF

Liechtenstein Football Cup seasons
Cup
Liechtenstein Cup